Five ships named Walpole have sailed as an East Indiaman for the British East India Company (EIC):

All were built on the River Thames, and named originally after Robert Walpole who was influential in the company's affairs in 1720 and 1721. His nephew Thomas Walpole (1727–1803), was a director of the company from 1753 to 1754.

  made four complete voyages for the EIC and was sold in 1737 for breaking up.
  made four complete voyages for the EIC and was sold in 1751. 
  made three complete voyages for the EIC and was captured by the French in 1762 during her fourth voyage.
  made seven complete voyages for the EIC and was sold in 1799 for breaking up.
  made four complete voyages for the EIC and was lost in 1808 as she was returning to London from her fifth voyage.

References
 

Ship names